Pseudonocardia compacta is a mesophilic bacterium from the genus of Pseudonocardia which has been isolated from garden soil.

References

Pseudonocardia
Bacteria described in 1983